Brisbane was an electoral district of the Legislative Assembly in the Australian state of Queensland from 1912 to 1977.

Based in inner central Brisbane, north of the Brisbane River, it was first created as a single member constituency for the 1912 state election, largely replacing the dual member constituency of Brisbane North. It was abolished at the 1977 state election and replaced by the new district of Brisbane Central.

It was historically a safe seat for the Labor Party.

Members for Brisbane

Election results

See also
 Electoral district of Brisbane City, which existed 1873 to 1878
 Electoral districts of Queensland
 Members of the Queensland Legislative Assembly by year
 :Category:Members of the Queensland Legislative Assembly by name

References

Former electoral districts of Queensland
1912 establishments in Australia
1977 disestablishments in Australia
Constituencies established in 1912
Constituencies disestablished in 1977